The 2016 Nebraska Republican presidential primary was held on May 10 in the U.S. state of Nebraska as one of the Republican Party's primaries ahead of the 2016 presidential election. The only candidate on the ballot who did not withdraw was Donald Trump.

The Libertarian Party held their own Nebraska primary on the same day. The Democratic Party held their Nebraska caucuses on March 5.

Opinion polling

Results

See also
 2016 Nebraska Democratic presidential caucuses and primary

References

Nebraska
Republican primary
2016